The Port of Gdańsk is a seaport located on the southern coast of Gdańsk Bay in the city of Gdańsk, extending along the Vistula estuary Martwa Wisła (Dead Vistula), Port Channel and Kashubia Canal. It is one of the largest seaports on the Baltic Sea.

The Port of Gdańsk is divided into two parts, the Inner and Exterior Port.

Inner Port 

Port of Gdańsk Cargo Logistics S.A. - universal port operator providing handling and storage services for bulk and general cargo
Gdańsk Container Terminal – providing feeder services
Ferry terminals
Polferries
Westerplatte
Phosphates terminal
Liquid and bulk sulphur terminal
Fruit handling terminal in the Port Free Zone

The Port of Gdańsk has specialized cargo handling equipment and port infrastructure, enabling among others the handling of grain, fertilizers, lumber, ore, steel and containers, as well as ro-ro vessel servicing.

Exterior — Northern Port 

Northern Port is located directly in the water basins of Gdańsk Bay.

Coal terminal
Naftoport — crude oil, heating oils, fuels terminal
LPG terminal
Deepwater Container Terminal

Trans-shipments

1978 – 2.8 million ton 
2000 – 16.5 million ton
2001 – 17.8 million ton
2002 – 17.4 million ton
2003 – 21.3 million ton
2004 – 23.3 million ton
2005 – 23.3 million ton
2006 – 22.4 million ton
2007 – 19.8 million ton
2008 – 17.8 million ton
2009 – 18.9 million ton
2010 – 27.2 million ton
2011 – 25.3 million ton
2012 – 26.9 million ton
2013 - 30.0 million ton 
2014 - 32.3 million ton
2015 - 35.9 million ton
2016 - 37.3 million ton 
2017 - 40.6 million ton 
2018 - 49.0 million ton

See also 
 Port of Gdynia

References

External links

 Port of Gdańsk website
 AIS  live vessel traffic in Port of Gdańsk
Google Earth plugin

Gdansk
Companies based in Gdańsk
Geography of Pomeranian Voivodeship
Transport in Gdańsk